Richard Timothy George Mansfield Parker, 9th Earl of Macclesfield (born 31 May 1943) is a British peer. He was a member of the House of Lords from 1992 until 1999.

The son of George Parker, 8th Earl of Macclesfield, and his wife Valerie Mansfield, he was educated at Stowe School and Worcester College, Oxford.

On 7 December 1992 he succeeded his father as Earl of Macclesfield, Viscount Parker, and Baron Parker.

On 11 August 1967 he married firstly Tatiana Cleone Anne Wheaton-Smith, daughter of Major Craig Wheaton-Smith. They were divorced in 1985, and in 1986 he married Sandra Hope Fiore. By his first wife he has three daughters:
Lady Tanya Susan (born 1971)
Lady Katherine Anne (born 1973)
Lady Marion Jane (born 1973)

Macclesfield was the last of the Parker family to live at Shirburn Castle, from which he was evicted in 2005 by other members of a family company which owned the property. They contended in court that he was "no more than tenant at will". However, the contents of the castle had been given to Macclesfield in 1967 by his grandfather, including three important libraries.

Macclesfield then decided to sell the libraries and some other items from the castle, including the Macclesfield Psalter, now in the Fitzwilliam Museum, and the Macclesfield Alphabet Book, now in the British Library. The receipts came to more than £16 million, "the highest total ever for any sale of scientific books and manuscripts". A painting by George Stubbs, "Brood Mares and Foals", was sold at auction in 2010 for £10,121,250, a record price for Stubbs.

Notes

|-

1943 births
Living people
Earls in the Peerage of Great Britain
People educated at Stowe School
Richard
Earls of Macclesfield
Macclesfield